The Hamilton County Courthouse is located in downtown Cincinnati, Ohio and contains the Hamilton County Common Pleas Court, the Municipal Court, Small Claims Court, and the Clerk of Courts offices.

The present courthouse is the fourth courthouse constructed on the site. The second courthouse was destroyed in the Cincinnati riots of 1884.

The Hamilton County Courthouse is connected to the county jail, the Hamilton County Justice Center, via a skybridge.

References

External links 
 Hamilton County Clerk of Courts
 Hamilton County Common Pleas Court
 Hamilton County Municipal Court

County courthouses in Ohio
Buildings and structures in Cincinnati